The Kwara State College of Education (Technical), Lafiagi is a state government higher education institution located in Lafiagi, Kwara State, Nigeria. The current Provost is Dr. Mohammed Dede Ibrahim
.

History 
The Kwara State College of Education (Technical), Lafiagi was established in 1991.

Courses 
The institution offers the following courses;

 Education and Political Science
 Business Education
 Education and Christian Religious Studies
 Mathematics
 Education and English Language
 Computer Education
 Economics
 Integrated Science
 Library and Information Science
 Biology Education
 Technical Education
 Education and Social Studies
 Chemistry Education

References

External links

Universities and colleges in Nigeria
1974 establishments in Nigeria
Educational institutions established in 1974